Leptosidin was the first aurone to be isolated in Coreopsis grandiflora by Geissman T.A. and Heaton C.D. in 1943. Leptosidin blocks the active residues of PRKACA.

References 

Aurones
Catechols
Phenol ethers